Jorge Llerena is a paralympic athlete from Uruguay.

Llerena competed in two Paralympics, firstly in 1996 where he competed in the T10 200m, winning a bronze medal. His final appearance came in 2000, not winning any medal.

References

External links
 

Paralympic athletes of Uruguay
Athletes (track and field) at the 1996 Summer Paralympics
Athletes (track and field) at the 2000 Summer Paralympics
Paralympic bronze medalists for Uruguay
Living people
Medalists at the 1996 Summer Paralympics
Year of birth missing (living people)
Paralympic medalists in athletics (track and field)
Uruguayan male sprinters
20th-century Uruguayan people
21st-century Uruguayan people